Presidential elections were held in South Ossetia on 9 April 2017 alongside a referendum on changing the official name of the state to "Republic of South Ossetia–the State of Alania", or "South Ossetia–Alania" for short. Incumbent President Leonid Tibilov ran for a second and final term in office, but was defeated by Anatoly Bibilov of the United Ossetia party.

Background
The date was set by Parliament on 18 January 2017.

Candidates
Leonid Tibilov, President of South Ossetia since 2012
Anatoly Bibilov, Speaker of Parliament
Alan Gagloyev, former KGB officer
Amiran Bagayev, construction company owner

Disqualified candidates
Eduard Kokoity, President of South Ossetia from 2001 until 2011. His candidacy was rejected due to the Central Electoral Commission finding that he did not meet the residency requirements; a candidate must live in South Ossetia for at least nine months of the year in the ten years preceding an election. The decision to disqualify Kokoity led to several protests in Tskhinvali, though the decision was not amended.

Opinion polls

Results
The final result had Bibilov well out in front with 55% of the vote.

References

South Ossetia
President
South Ossetia
Presidential elections in South Ossetia